Marvin, Welch & Farrar is the eponymous debut album of British-Australian music group Marvin, Welch & Farrar, released in February 1971.

Critical reception

Disc and Music Echo wrote: "The guitars/drums/vocal format is tried-and-true – yet in their case particularly pleasing. But the Hank/Bruce songs, while good, smell somewhat of those CSN&Y-cum-Hollies harmonies. Therefore, despite their appeal, they tend to become predictable in parts. Their "Faithful" single is included, and Hank and Bruce deserve full marks for a very pretty album, even if it doesn't exactly stop you in your tracks".

In a retrospective review for AllMusic, Dave Thompson wrote "Marvin Welch & Farrar may or may not be the template around which everyone from vintage 10cc to classic Wishbone Ash modeled their magic. But it certainly sounds like it should have been." They also wrote "Marvin, Welch and Farrar crafted a rousing, respectable and utterly enjoyable early 1970s rock album".

Track listing
 "You're Burning Bridges" (Hank Marvin) - 4:00
"A Thousand Conversations" (Bruce Welch, Hank Marvin) - 
 "Brownie Kentucky" (Hank Marvin) - 2:32
 "My Home Town" (Hank Marvin, Bruce Welch, John Farrar) - 3:14
 "Silvery Rain" (Hank Marvin) - 2:30
 "Throw Down a Line" (Hank Marvin) - 3:20
 "Baby I'm Calling You" (Bruce Welch, Hank Marvin) - 2:46
 "Faithful" (Hank Marvin, Bruce Welch, John Farrar) - 2:19
 "Mistress Fate & Father Time" (Bruce Welch, Hank Marvin) - 3:13
"Take Her Away" (Bruce Welch, Hank Marvin)
 "Wish You Were Here" (Bruce Welch, Hank Marvin) - 3:20
 "Mr. Sun" (Bruce Welch, Hank Marvin) - 2:45
 "Strike a Light" (John Farrar, Peter Best)
The North American release omits "A Thousand Conversations" and "Take Her Away"

Personnel
Marvin, Welch & Farrar
 Hank Marvin – vocals, guitar
 Bruce Welch – vocals, guitar
 John Farrar – vocals, guitar, string arrangement
with:
 Dave Richmond – bass guitar
 Peter Vince – occasional piano and organ
 Alan Hawkshaw – occasional piano and organ
 Clem Cattini – drums
 Graeme Hall – strings conductor
Technical
 Peter Vince - engineer
 Richard Lush – tape operator
 Hipgnosis – cover design, photography

Charts

References

1971 debut albums
albums produced by John Farrar
Regal Zonophone Records albums
albums with cover art by Hipgnosis